The Kempegowda Award or Nadaprabhu Kempegowda Award is a civilian award presented annually by Bruhat Bengaluru Mahanagara Palike (BBMP), Bengaluru, Karnataka, India.

The award nomination is based on the notable contributions of civilians, in the field of medicine, education, media, sports, theatre, film, literature, environment, folklore, music, dance, yogasana, judiciary, journalism, culture, photography, social service, astrology and painting.

On 16 August 2018, more than 250 people with notable achievements are presented the award, in the ceremony held in Dr.Rajkumar Glasshouse, BBMP Office, Bangalore.

History 
The award is named after the feudatory ruler of Vijayanagara Empire, Nadaprabhu Hiriya Kempe Gowda, who built the city of Bengaluru in 1537. The award ceremony is organized annually, in April, on the eve of Kempegowda's birthday, which is seen in the state as Kempegowda day or ′Kempegowda Jayanthi′ which is on 27 June. The award presentation was temporarily paused in 2007, and after a gap of four years, it was reinitiated in 2011.

2017 
On 11 April 244 people were awarded in the ceremony, where Karaga was also held. BBMP decided to award all its permanent employees with the ′Civic service employees' award′.

2016 
On 22 April 162 people were presented the award, in the ceremony.

2015 
On 4 April, the ceremony was held and 94 people were awarded.

2014 
187 people were awarded including a cash prize of ₹12,000.

2013 
109 people were awarded including a cash prize of ₹15,000.

2012 
50 people were awarded including a cash prize of ₹25,000.

2011 
274 people were awarded including a cash prize of ₹20,000.

Kempegowda Awardees List of Year 2018
Gireesha yadava.a.m  social worker

Kempegowda Awardees List of Year 2017

Awardees List of 2016

Awardees List of 2015

Awardees List of 2014

Awardees List of 2013

Awardees List of 2012

Awardees List of 2011

References

Civil awards and decorations of Karnataka